Spirited Migration is the debut studio album by American doom metal band Dark Castle, released in 2009.

Track listing

References

2009 debut albums
Dark Castle (band) albums